Agnes is a small town in Victoria, Australia. It is located at the junction of the South Gippsland Highway and Barry Road, close to Corner Inlet. Although it used to be thriving, and even had a state school, it now has really nothing more there than a couple of houses and a waterfall. 
 
The railway arrived in 1892 and the Post Office opened on 28 December 1915 and closed in 1960.

See also
Agnes railway station

References

Coastal towns in Victoria (Australia)
Towns in Victoria (Australia)
Shire of South Gippsland